Pedro Jorge Simon (born January 31, 1930) is a Brazilian politician, lawyer and professor. He represented Rio Grande do Sul in the Federal Senate from 1991 to 2015. Previously, he was governor of Rio Grande do Sul from 1987 to 1990. Simon also served as Minister of Agriculture from 1985 to 1986. He is a member of the Brazilian Democratic Movement Party and an important historical figure of the movement towards redemocratization in Brazil.

Biography
Pedro Simon is a descendant of Lebanese immigrants who arrived in Caxias do Sul in 1922 with other catholic families such as Sehbe, Kalil and David. A law major from the Pontifical Catholic University of Rio Grande do Sul with a postgraduate degree in political economy, and also a specialist in criminal law, Simon was a professor at the University of Caxias do Sul. Simon made several study travels, both as an academic and as a politician, to countries in Europe and Latin America, in addition to Canada, the United States, Lebanon, Egypt, India, Japan, Syria, Pakistan, Thailand, among others. In Paris, he attended Sorbonne University.

He began his political career in the Brazilian Labour Party, his first important position being that of city councilor of his hometown, Caxias do Sul. In 1962 he was elected to the Legislative Assembly of Rio Grande do Sul. With the arrival of the military regime, bipartisanship was established, so Simon joined the Brazilian Democratic Movement (MDB). He remained in the position of state deputy until 1978, the year he was elected senator. From 1985 to 1986, he was Minister of Agriculture in the government of Tancredo Neves. He left the position to run for the governorship of Rio Grande do Sul for a second time, this time successfully. He resigned as governor in 1990 and was elected once again to the Federal Senate, where he remained until 2015.

He is a widower of Tânia Simon, who died in 1985. They had three children: Tiago, Tomaz (deceased) and Mateus (deceased). Today he is married to Ivete, with whom he had another son, Pedro.

References

Living people
1930 births
Members of the Federal Senate (Brazil)
Governors of Rio Grande do Sul
Agriculture ministers of Brazil
Members of the Legislative Assembly of Rio Grande do Sul
Brazilian Roman Catholics
Brazilian Democratic Movement politicians
Brazilian people of Lebanese descent